Phạm Ngũ Lão is a ward of District 1 in Ho Chi Minh City, Vietnam.

References

Populated places in Ho Chi Minh City